Bálint Máté Vécsei (born 13 July 1993) is a Hungarian footballer who plays as a midfielder for Ferencváros.

Club career
He started playing football at the Kazinczy Ferenc elementary school in Kazincbarcika. Since his father is a geography-physical education teacher, he immediately fell in love with football. Vécsei started his career in the Kazincbarcikai SC's youth team.

Budapest Honvéd
On 28 July 2008, Budapest Honvéd signed him. On 11 May 2011, he played his first Hungarian League match against Győri. In the 2012–13 season of the Hungarian League he played 28 matches and also scored four goals.

Bologna
On 18 August 2015, he was signed by the Serie A club Bologna F.C. 1909. At the same time he was loaned to U.S. Lecce.

Lugano
On 13 July 2016, Vécsei joined Swiss club Lugano on a season-long loan deal. During his time at Lugano he provided a man of the match performance against FC Sion with two goals in the 77th and 92nd minute.

Ferencváros
On 29 December 2019, he signed to Hungary with Ferencváros. Officially available to the club on 1 January 2020.

On 16 June 2020, he became champion with Ferencváros by beating Budapest Honvéd FC at the Hidegkuti Nándor Stadion on the 30th match day of the 2019–20 Nemzeti Bajnokság I season.

Club statistics

International goals 

Scores and results list Hungary's goal tally first, score column indicates score after each Vécsei goal.

Honours

Ferencvárosi TC
 Nemzeti Bajnokság I: 2019–20, 2020–21, 2021-22
 Magyar Kupa: 2021-22

References

HLSZ

1993 births
Living people
Sportspeople from Miskolc
Hungarian footballers
Hungary youth international footballers
Hungary under-21 international footballers
Hungary international footballers
Association football midfielders
Nemzeti Bajnokság I players
Swiss Super League players
Budapest Honvéd FC players
Budapest Honvéd FC II players
Bologna F.C. 1909 players
FC Lugano players
Hungarian expatriate footballers
Hungarian expatriate sportspeople in Italy
Hungarian expatriate sportspeople in Switzerland
Expatriate footballers in Italy
Expatriate footballers in Switzerland
U.S. Lecce players
Ferencvárosi TC footballers